Egor Mikhailovich Shaykov (born 23 June 1980) is a former Russian association football and beach soccer player who was active as forward. Shaykov started his career in association football, his best results coming from the period where he played for FC Arsenal Tula. Since 2005, he played for beach soccer teams, his best results coming for BSC Lokomotiv Moscow, where he played from 2010 until his retirement in 2018. He is Merited Master of Sports of Russia.

Career

Playing career 
Shaykov was sportive since early age. He went to swimming for three years until he switched to ice hockey at the age of seven, but he felt it was not his type of sports. Once Shaykov's sports teacher recommended him to Nikolay Nikolayevich Sevastyanov, who would become Shaykov's first coach. Sevastyanov went to different schools searching for possible pupils for his club of the large sports school Torpedo. Preliminarily, out of eight people Shaykov was the only one to be chosen.

Shaykov started his career for the association football team Torpedo-ZIL Moscow and then for the mirror team Torpedo-Luzhniki (now Torpedo Moscow). He played for FC Arsenal Tula for three years, collecting 12 goals in 76 caps; one of his goals was the 800th for Arsenal at the Russian Championships. He then played for FC Titan Klin for around half a year before making a short break.

In 2005, he was invited by future beach soccer top coach Evgeny Pisarev to play for the Russia national beach soccer team. In their first tournament at the 2005 Euro Beach Soccer Cup team Russia finished second. Shaykov then debuted for BSC Strogino. 

In 2010, Shaykov switched to BSC Delta together with three other teammates, but in the same year he debuted for BSC Lokomotiv Moscow.

On 21 December 2012, Shaykov was named Merited Master of Sports by the order of the Sports Minister.

At the inaugural 2013 Euro Winners Cup, Lokomotiv went on to win the trophy and Shaykov was named MVP.

Shaykov's last appearance in beach soccer was as a player of Lokomotiv at the Russian Super Cup, where the Moscow club lost to BSC Kristall, 3–4.

Coaching career 

After his retirement, Shaykov serves as coach for the Latvian beach soccer club "Academy" (also known as "Linden City"). He brought them to the final of the Latvia Cup, where they defeated Krass, 5–1.

Achievements

National team
 FIFA Beach Soccer World Cup champion: 2011, 2013
 Euro Beach Soccer Cup champion: 2012
 Euro Beach Soccer League champion: 2009, 2011, 2013, 2014, 2017
 Beach Soccer Intercontinental Cup champion: 2011, 2012, 2015

Clubs
 Russian National champion: 2008, 2009, 2010, 2011, 2012, 2017
 Russian Cup winner: 2008, 2009, 2011, 2012, 2013
 Russian Super Cup winner: 2011
 Euro Winners Cup winner: 2013
 Mundialito de Clubes winner: 2012

Individually
2011 season
Euro Beach Soccer League, Stage 4 – MVP
2012 season
Merited Master of Sports (21 December 2012)

References

External links
 Profile at Beach Soccer Russia

1980 births
Living people
Footballers from Moscow
Russian footballers
Russian beach soccer players
Association football forwards
FC Torpedo Moscow players
FC Torpedo-2 players
FC Arsenal Tula players
European Games gold medalists for Russia
Beach soccer players at the 2015 European Games
European Games medalists in beach soccer